Unarmed Verses is a Canadian documentary film, directed by Charles Officer and released in 2017. The film centres on the predominantly Black Canadian former residents of Villaways, a Toronto Community Housing project which is undergoing demolition and revitalization.

The film premiered at Hot Docs, where it won the award for Best Canadian Feature Documentary.

Synopsis 
The documentary follows a year in the life of 12-year-old Francine Valentine and her family during her involvement in a songwriting and recording program run by Art Starts. Valentine struggles with her lack of self-esteem and self-identity. The film is set in the backdrop of community gentrification and apparent lack of concern for her and her neighbourhood.

Awards
In December 2017, the Toronto International Film Festival named the film to its annual Canada's Top Ten list of the ten best Canadian films. It won the People's Choice Award at the Canada's Top Ten minifestival in January 2018.

At the 5th Canadian Screen Awards, Unarmed Verses received two Canadian Screen Award nominations: for Best Feature Length Documentary, and for Best Cinematography in a Documentary.

References

External links
 
 Unarmed Verses on NFB
 Unarmed Verses on TIFF

2017 films
2017 documentary films
Canadian documentary films
Films directed by Charles Officer
National Film Board of Canada documentaries
Documentary films about Toronto
Films shot in Toronto
Documentary films about Black Canadians
2010s English-language films
2010s Canadian films